"Out of left field" is American slang meaning "unexpected", "odd" or "strange". The phrase came from baseball terminology, referring to a play in which the ball is thrown from the area covered by the left fielder to either home plate or first base, surprising the runner. Variations include "out in left field" and simply "left field".

According to the Major League Baseball website the term means "crazy." Cook County Hospital (by the West Side Grounds, the Chicago Cubs first location under what is now the University of Illinois at Chicago College of Medicine) had a mental institution behind left field, and "patients could be heard yelling and screaming things at fans behind the left field wall." This is disputed  since there is no evidence of the phrase being used before the 1940s, and the Cubs moved from the ballpark in 1915. 

There is another usage that comes also from baseball. During a time period, the shape of the outfield in Yankee Stadium roughly approximated an oval, with the "long" portion pointing to left-center. A left-fielder would thus typically be stationed further back from the action than the center or right fielders, as he would have a greater amount of ground to cover. Hence, "out in left field" meant one was furthest from the action taking place at home-plate, and the most likely to draw erroneous, fanciful conclusions about that action;  thus, in a general sense, someone out in the left field would be someone who was not taking part in the action of whatever endeavor we were talking about.

Music industry
Popular music historian Arnold Shaw wrote in 1949 for the Music Library Association that the term "out of left field" was first used in the idiomatic sense of "from out of nowhere" by the music industry to refer to a song that unexpectedly performed well in the market. Based on baseball lingo, a sentence such as "That was a hit out of left field" was used by song pluggers who promoted recordings and sheet music, to describe a song requiring no effort to sell. A "rocking chair hit" was the kind of song which came "out of left field" and sold itself, allowing the song plugger to relax. A 1943 article in Billboard magazine expands the use to describe people unexpectedly drawn to radio broadcasting:

Further instances of the phrase were published in the 1940s, including more times in Billboard magazine and once in a humor book titled How to Be Poor.

Later explanations
In May 1981, columnist William Safire asked readers of The New York Times to send him any ideas they had regarding the origin of the phrase "out of left field"—he did not know where it came from, and did not refer to Shaw's work. On June 28, 1981, he devoted most of his Sunday column to the phrase, offering up various responses he received. The earliest scholarly citation Safire could find was a 1961 article in the journal American Speech, which defined the variation "out in left field" as meaning "disoriented, out of contact with reality."
Linguist John Algeo told Safire that the phrase most likely came from baseball observers rather than from baseball fans or players.

In Safire's Political Dictionary, Safire writes that the phrase "out of left field" means "out of the ordinary, out of touch, far out." The variation "out in left field" means alternately "removed from the ordinary, unconventional" or "out of contact with reality, out of touch." He compares the term to left-wing politics and the Left Coast—slang for the liberal-leaning coastal cities in California, Oregon and Washington.

In 1998, American English professor Robert L. Chapman, in his book American Slang, wrote that the phrase "out of left field" was in use by 1953. He did not cite Shaw's work and he did not point to printed instances of the phrase in the 1940s. Marcus Callies, an associate professor of English and philology at the University of Mainz in Germany, wrote that "the precise origin is unclear and disputed", referring to Christine Ammer's conclusion in The American Heritage Dictionary of Idioms. Callies suggested that the left fielder in baseball might throw the ball to home plate in an effort to get the runner out before he scores, and that the ball, coming from behind the runner out of left field, would surprise the runner.

From the Way Out In Left Field Society:
"The phrase "way out in left field" has evolved to mean an eccentric, odd, misguided or peculiar statement or act.  The origin lies in the West Side Grounds that the Chicago Cubs called home from 1893 to 1915.  As legend has it, a mental hospital was located directly behind the left field wall.  The institute housed mental patients who could be heard making strange and bizarre comments within listening distance of players and fans.  Thus, if someone said that you were "way out in left field," the person was questioning your sanity and comparing you with a mental patient.

References

English phrases
Metaphors referring to sport